This article contains a list of railway junction stations in India. This list is arranged alphabetically.

See also
 Annual passenger earnings details of railway stations in Kerala

 Junction